Madig was an Iranian king who ruled in present-day northern Iraq. He is mentioned in a historical text called the Book of the Deeds of Ardashir son of Babak.

Origins 
Although he is called a “Kurd” in the book, the word was used as a social term during this period, designating Iranian nomads, rather than a concrete ethnic group.
According to James Boris, the word first became an ethnic identity in the 12th and 13th century.

Biography 
According to the Book of the Deeds of Ardashir son of Babak, Ardashir I, after having defeated the Parthian Artabanus V, began subduing the vassal-states of the fallen Parthian Empire. With reinforcements from Zavul, he invaded the domains of Madig, but was repelled by the latter. However, Ardashir later returned with an army of 4,000 men, and defeated Madig in a night attack. The Book says the following thing:

References 

3rd-century Iranian people
Zoroastrian rulers